The 1911 International 500-Mile Sweepstakes Race was held at the Indianapolis Motor Speedway on Tuesday, May 30, 1911. It was the inaugural running of the Indianapolis 500, which is one of the most prestigious automobile races in the world. Ray Harroun, an engineer with the Marmon Motor Car Company, came out of retirement to drive, and won the inaugural event before re-retiring for good in the winner's circle.

Over the previous two seasons (1909 and 1910), the Speedway had scheduled numerous smaller races during a series of meets over the two years. In a departure from that policy, for 1911 the management decided to instead schedule a single, large-scale event attracting widespread attention from both American and European racing teams and manufacturers. It proved to be a successful event, immediately establishing itself as both the premier motorsports competition in the US and one of the most prestigious in the world.

One Race

"Too much racing" 
The 1910 racing season at Indianapolis Motor Speedway began well, with an estimated 60,000 spectators for the  Wheeler-Schebler Trophy on Memorial Day, won by Ray Harroun. Throughout the remainder of the season, however, the crowds grew progressively smaller, and after seeing a second decline in attendance in as many days for Labor Day, 5 September 1910, the final day of the concluding meet, Speedway co-founders Carl Fisher, James Allison, Arthur Newby and Frank Wheeler conferred to decide on a new course for the following year.

While the appearance on Monday of some 18,000 was reasonable enough, given both the rain showers occurring early that morning and the large parade held downtown during the afternoon, neither the two days of the Labor Day meet nor the July 4 weekend races had come near to equaling the Memorial Day turnout. While potential explanations for the decline included the high heat of summer and the women of the city making family holiday plans that did not include automobile racing, one of the most likely, they reasoned, was an overabundance of the very events they exhibited: too many races had diluted turnout down to only those most interested in the sport.

Timing
By the next day, Tuesday, 6 September 1910, local newspapers had already heard rumors of the decision, and reported that the four partners would likely soon choose to concentrate on a singular, major event for 1911. The endurance event was favored by several manufacturers, but debate soon proceeded as to what would be most beneficial to the spectators as well as the participants. While a 24-hour race would be possible on a technical level despite its extreme nature, all agreed that potential ticket-buyers would inevitably depart the grounds well before its conclusion. The race winner, with purse estimates ranging toward $30,000, could expect to see as much as $12,000.

In choices for a specific date to hold the race, Memorial Day, already the occasion of the largest attendance, was always foremost. As suggested to the Speedway owners by business associate Lem Trotter, the time coincided with the completion of a late-spring agricultural practice known as "haying," after which the farmers acquired an effective two-week break. While the intention, Trotter argued, would certainly be to draw from far more than just the local farming community, simple business sense called for as little interference as possible with the regional economy.

Preparation, and the "Month of May"
As desired and expected, news of a contest of such distance evoked strong enthusiasm both within and without the motorsport community. Newspaper and trade magazine articles used ever-new superlatives for the challenges expected to soon face both drivers and engineers, and continuing discussion throughout the spring and winter kept the race as the primary conversation piece of the average citizen. Everyone, it seemed, had something to say about it.

Due to the publicity thus created, Speedway management, which had for the previous two seasons of meets charged the effectively nominal entry fee of one dollar per mile of scheduled race distances, took measures to ensure that the likely large entry list did not include any that were frivolous: at an accordingly heightened fee of $500 per car, participation became a nominally risky proposition to teams and manufacturers, since, although the high finishers were due to receive record purse money and accessory prizes, no money at all was offered to finishers below tenth place. Interest, however, was far from dampened, with entry blanks distributed over the course of the following month quickly returning filled, the first of which being an automobile built by the J. I. Case Threshing Machine Company of Racine, Wisconsin, to be driven by Lewis Strang. By 1 May 1911, the final day for entry filing, a high total of some 46 cars had been nominated to compete.

1 May also marked the beginning of a long tradition of the opening of the Speedway, on the first day of the month of the race, to free practice on the circuit during daylight hours by any and all participants. One such example, the double-entry Pope-Hartford team based in Springfield, Massachusetts, came by way of the team's actual racing cars themselves simply being driven cross-country, while loaded up with toolboxes and as many spare parts as they could hold, making overnight stops in New York City, Buffalo, Cleveland and Columbus, Ohio, before finally arriving, where they were duly met at the city's East Washington Street by Frank Fox, who was not only the slated driver of one of the two cars but also the company's local agent.

Ultimately, of the full forty-six entries originally submitted, only the two cars of the Falcar team from Moline, Illinois failed to appear, due to an inability to acquire critical chassis pieces.

Setting the field

To further refine the entry list as the date of the race approached, a qualification system was implemented whereby each car would be required to demonstrate a sufficiently competitive pace. Thus, all cars successfully completing an officially-timed run of the quarter-mile distance at or under 12 seconds would be accepted into the starting field; those that did not would be given two additional attempts before being rejected, a policy that began the tradition of three qualification attempts allotted to each entered car.

In the years following these inaugural qualification sessions, which were held on 27 and 28 May 1911, anecdotes would occasionally arise, and thereafter be steadily embellished in their retelling, regarding the purported qualifying times and speeds of given competitors, and how they compared to one another. In reality, no records of the sessions were kept at all, let alone publicized, with the sole objective being the confirmation of each car's capability to achieve the minimum speed. Also in contrast to later eras, both the starting order and the car numbering of the participants were determined not by respective speeds or previous seasonal point totals, but by entry date, with the Strang-driven Case entry being assigned #1 in the first starting position.

The 500-mile race

The largest racing purse offered to date, $27,550, drew 46 entries from the United States and Europe, from which 40 qualified by sustaining  along the quarter mile-long main straight. Grid positions were determined by date of filing of official entry forms, rather than speed, a difference from the contemporary European practice of lottery. Entries were prescribed by rules to have a minimum weight of 2,300 lb (1,043 kg) and a maximum engine size of 600 cubic inches (9.83 litres) displacement.

The 40 cars lined up five to a row, except for the first and last. In the first row, the Stoddard-Dayton pace car was situated on the inside (driven by IMS owner Carl Fisher), with four competitors cars rounding out the row. Rows 2-8 had five cars each, while the final row had only one car in it. Fisher's use of the Stoddard-Dayton is believed to constitute the first use of such a vehicle, for the first known mass rolling start of an automobile race.

Amid roiling smoke, the roar of the 40 machines' engines, and the waving of a red flag which signalled 'clear course ahead', American Johnny Aitken, in a National, took the lead from the fourth starting spot on the extreme outside of the first row, and held it until lap 5 when Spencer Wishart took over in a Mercedes, himself soon overtaken by David L. Bruce-Brown's Fiat which would go on to dominate the first half of the race. Sadly on lap 12 tragedy would strike as Sam Dickson (the riding mechanic for Arthur Greiner) was the first person killed in history during the Indianapolis 500. One of the front wheels came off the American Simplex car Greiner was driving, causing him to lose control and both men to be thrown from the car. While Greiner escaped with a broken arm, Dickson flew into a fence 20 feet (6.1 m) from the car. Reports state that Dickson was killed instantly, although the crowd evidently swarmed around the body, requiring the state militia who were acting as security at the event to use their guns as clubs to clear a path for the attending doctors. Nearing the halfway point, Ray Harroun, an engineer for the Marmon-Nordyke company and defending AAA national champion, and the only driver competing without a riding mechanic due to his first-ever-recorded use of a cowl-mounted rear-view mirror, passed Bruce-Brown for the lead in his self-designed, six-cylinder "Marmon Wasp" (so named for its distinctively sharp-pointed, wasp-like tail).

Others faltered during the marathon event, 14 cars fell out of the race.

Harroun, relieved by Cyrus Patschke for 35 laps (87.5 miles / 140.82 km), led 88 of the 200 laps, the most among the race's seven leaders, for a race-average speed of 74.602 mph (120.060 km/h) in a total time of 6:42:08 for the 500-mile (804.67 km) distance to win.
During the midpoint of the second half the race, Harroun and Lozier driver Ralph Mulford had fought an intense duel, with Harroun holding a small advantage near the 340 mile (550 kilometer) mark, whereupon one of the Wasp's tires failed. Harroun's forced stop allowed Mulford to move to the front, before Mulford also pitted for new rubber. After Mulford came back onto the track, Harroun was scored in the lead with a 1-minute 48 second advantage, and victory.

After the race, and collection of $10,000 for first place, Harroun returned to the position he had taken at the end of the 1910 racing season: retirement. He would never race again.

Controversy
Upon Harroun's declared victory, second-place finisher Mulford supposedly protested, contending he had lapped Harroun when the Marmon limped in on the torn tire, an argument appearing plausible to some, due to an accident disrupting the official timing and scoring stand at nearly the same time. However, race officials were quick to note Mulford's subsequent pit stop forced the Lozier crew to spend several minutes themselves changing a tire which stuck to the wheel hub; Mulford's protest was thus denied.

According to track historian Donald Davidson, no protests were filed at the end of the race and Mulford offered congratulations to Harroun in the Detroit Free Press newspaper on June 4. Davidson has also pointed out that Mulford was reported by contemporary publications to have changed 14 tires during the course of the race, including one from a blown tire in turn one. Changing tires at the time was a lengthy and painstaking process, as the wheels were typically not removable. Tires had to be pried off of the rims, remounted, and inflated - all using hand tools, and in the precarious confines of the primitive pit stalls. Mulford himself even understood and admitted that he lost at least 14 minutes of track position due to his numerous pit stops.

After blowing the tire on turn one, Mulford had to limp around the track for almost an entire lap, and subsequently bent the rim. That necessitated an even longer pit stop at that juncture to hammer out the damage. The accounts from the newspapers claim that Harroun changed only four tires all day during only three pit stops. Harroun's team changed the right rear tire three times, and one other unspecified tire. Harroun's shorter elapsed time in the pits is alone considered sufficient to more than overcome any track position advantage Mulford might have been thought to have. But the undermining evidence to support Harroun as the rightful winner was the team strategy to run a constant 75 mph pace, regardless of position, in order to save tire wear. During the 1910 Wheeler-Schebler Trophy Race, as well as during test runs in May 1911, Harroun discovered that by merely running a constant 75 mph pace instead of an 80 mph (or faster) pace, he would substantially reduce his tire wear and increase tire life.

Davidson contends that Mulford did not make serious claims to victory later in life, as some have suggested. And in fact the controversy itself did not begin to inflame until decades after the race. Likewise, internet-based urban legends, and a book published in 2011, have fueled the controversy. It is also possible that Mulford's statements in the Detroit Free Press interview were misunderstood or purposely misconstrued. While giving full credit to Harroun for winning the race, Mulford did for himself claim the world record for 500 miles driven solo (Harroun had relief help from Cyrus Patschke). He also made the largely inconsequential claim that minus the stoppage time needed for pit stops (over 14 minutes), he likely completed the 500 miles (running time only) in less elapsed time than Harroun & Patschke.

Box score

Starting grid

 * Entry started in race by  Bert Adams, finished by  Mel Marquette.

Race results

Notes
 * Due to an accident at the timing and scoring stand, laps 138 through 176 were unofficially recorded.

 ** Ray Harroun was relieved by Cyrus Patschke for approximately 35 laps at the halfway point of the race.

 †1  De Palma is usually shown as American, but his application for a US passport (available at ) reveals that he did not become a US citizen until 1920.

 †2  Jagersberger was Austrian-born.

 †3 Chevrolet is usually shown as American, but documents available at  show he did not become a US citizen until at least 1917.

 †4 Basle is usually shown as American, but documents available at  show he did not become a US citizen until at least 1917.

Statistics
Race field average engine displacement:
 460 in3 / 7.54 L
Race field average qualifying speed:
 No full lap
Finishing entries average time and finishing speed:
 7:05:27
 70.74 mph / 113.85 km/h

Notes

References

Works cited

2006 Indianapolis 500 Official Program
Summary of race at www.champcarstars.com

Indianapolis 500 races
Indianapolis 500
Indianapolis 500
Indianapolis 500
May 1911 sports events